National Institute of Technology Uttarakhand (also known as NIT Uttarakhand or NITUK) is a public technical university in the Indian state of Uttarakhand. It was founded in 2009, as one of the 10 new National Institutes of Technology in India, and is recognised as an Institute of National Importance. It admitted its first batch of students in 2010–11.

The temporary campus is located in Govt. ITI, Srinagar, Uttarakhand, Pauri Garhwal district.

Foundation 
Established in 2009 under the Act of Parliament by the Ministry of Education (Shiksha Mantralaya).

Campus
The institute is currently operating from temporary campus located at Srinagar (Garhwal), Uttarakhand. The permanent campus is being built at Sumari, Uttarakhand.

Academics

Ranking 
National Institute of Technology, Uttarakhand  was ranked 131 among engineering colleges by the National Institutional Ranking Framework (NIRF) in 2021.

Admissions
Since 2013, the Bachelor of Technology admissions for Indian students were taken through JEE Main The B.Tech. admissions for foreign students are done through Direct Admission of Students Abroad (DASA) Scheme.

For admissions to M.Tech./M.Arch./M.Plan. programs, one has to qualify GATE exam & then has to undergo CCMT (Centralized Counselling for M.Tech./M.Arch./M.Plan. Admissions).

Academic Programmes
The university offers degrees in Sciences & Humanities (2010), Computer Science engineering (2010), Electrical and Electronic engineering (2010), Electronics and Communication Engineering (2010), Mechanical Engineering (2012) and Civil Engineering (2013).

References

National Institutes of Technology
Engineering colleges in Uttarakhand
Pauri Garhwal district
Educational institutions established in 2010
2010 establishments in Uttarakhand